Afritz am See is a municipality in Villach-Land District in the Austrian state of Carinthia.

Name
The name Afritz is ultimately derived from the Slovene prepositional phrase za brdce 'behind the small hill'. The Slovene phrase fused to yield *Zabrdce, which was borrowed into Middle High German as *Zafriz (from which, in turn, Cobrc was borrowed back into Slovene). The initial z- was misunderstood as the Middle High German preposition ze 'at', yielding the modern German decomposition Afritz.

Geography

It is located within the Gegend Valley surrounded by the Nock Mountains, the western part of the Gurktal Alps mountain range, on the southern shore of small Afritzer See (Lake Afritz). The municipal area comprises the cadastral communities of Afritz and Berg ob Afritz.

History
The remote valley was not settled until the High Middle Ages. Afritz itself was first mentioned in a 1408 deed, then an estate held by the Counts of Ortenburg.

In 1973 the municipality merged with neighbouring Feld am See, but since 1991 has again been a municipality in its own right. The appendix am See was added in 2000, mainly for tourist reasons, though officially Lake Afritz belongs to the municipal area of Feld am See.

Politics
Seats in the municipal assembly (Gemeinderat) as of 2009 elections:
Freedom Party in Carinthia (FPÖ): 9
Social Democratic Party of Austria (SPÖ): 4
Austrian People's Party (ÖVP): 2

References

Cities and towns in Villach-Land District